George Burton Pinkney (January 11, 1859 – November 10, 1926) born in Orange Prairie, Peoria, Illinois, was a third baseman for the Cleveland Blues (1884), Brooklyn Grays/Bridegrooms/Grooms(1885–91), St. Louis Browns (1892), and Louisville Colonels (1893).

He helped the Bridegrooms win the 1889 American Association pennant and the 1890 National League pennant.

Pinkney led the American Association in games (141), at bats (597), and walks (70) in 1886.

He led the American Association in games (143), runs (134), times on base (234), and outs (419) in 1888.

In 10 seasons Pinkney played in 1,163 games and had 4,610 at-bats, 874 runs, 1,212 hits, 170 doubles, 56 triples, 21 home runs, 539 RBI, 526 walks, .263 batting average, .345 on-base percentage, .338 slugging percentage, and 1,557 total bases. When he retired, he held Major League Baseball's all-time record for most consecutive games played (577) and innings played (5,152). Both records have since been surpassed, the innings played mark standing for 95 years until it was broken by Cal Ripken Jr. He remained the only player to play in more than 500 consecutive games until Fred Luderus played in 533 games.

He died in Peoria, Illinois, at the age of 67 and was interred at Springdale Cemetery.

See also
Iron man
Major League Baseball consecutive games played streaks
List of Major League Baseball career stolen bases leaders
List of Major League Baseball annual runs scored leaders
List of Major League Baseball single-game hits leaders

References

Sources

Baseball Almanac
Society for American Baseball Research

1859 births
1926 deaths
Major League Baseball third basemen
19th-century baseball players
Baseball players from Illinois
Cleveland Blues (NL) players
Brooklyn Grays players
Brooklyn Grooms players
Brooklyn Bridegrooms players
St. Louis Browns (NL) players
Louisville Colonels players
Peoria Reds players
Atlanta Firecrackers players
Grand Rapids Rippers players
People from Peoria County, Illinois